Jean Dessès (6 August 1904 – 2 August 1970) was a world leading fashion designer in the 1940s, 1950s and 1960s. His designs reflected the influences of his travels, specializing in creating draped evening gowns in chiffon and mousseline, based on early Greek and Egyptian robes.

Biography
 

Born Jean Dimitre Verginie in Alexandria, Egypt, to Greek parents, Dessès originally set out to study law, but, in 1925, he abandoned his legal studies and began working for Maison Jane, a Parisian couture house where, in 1937, he opened his own couture salon. After World War II, he traveled extensively throughout the world. His work was influenced by his travels, creating draped evening gowns in chiffon, embroidered dresses, sheath dresses with tight jackets and flowing skirts. His fashion was very popular with European royalty and movie stars. Among his clientele were the Queen and royal princesses of Greece, the Duchess of Windsor, Madame Jean (Lilia) Ralli, the first Mrs. Aristotle Onassis, Athina Livanos,  and society hostess Elsa Maxwell. In 1962, he designed the wedding gown worn by Princess Sophia of Greece (later Queen Sofia of Spain) for her marriage to the future King Juan Carlos I of Spain. Valentino worked with Desses for several years in the 1950s and gained much hands-on experience, as did Guy Laroche who in the 1950s was Desses' assistant.

In 1963, at age 60, he retired to Greece because of poor health, where he ran a small boutique which he had opened eight years earlier. He died in Athens in 1970. In the 1990s, his fashion designs saw a revival with the interest in vintage dresses. Naomi Campbell wore a vintage boned bodice and ruched silk Desses gown in May 1999 at a Christie's party. Later, in 2001, Renée Zellweger wore a lemon yellow strapless 1950s Dessès gown to the Academy Awards. Similarly, Jennifer Lopez wore a vintage moss green Desses gown, made with 50 yards of chiffon, to the 2006 Academy Awards.

The fashion designer Jean Dessès brought also out a perfume called Kalispera.

References

External links

 
 

1904 births
1970 deaths
Egyptian people of Greek descent
People from Alexandria
Greek fashion designers
French fashion designers
Egyptian emigrants to France